The 2002 Caribbean Football Union Club Championship was an international club football competition held in the Caribbean to determine the region's qualifiers to the CONCACAF Champions' Cup.

Group winners Arnett Gardens of Jamaica and W Connection of Trinidad and Tobago advanced to the 2003 CONCACAF Champions' Cup.

Preliminary

Final round

Group A

 Club Franciscain withdrew due to participation in Coupe de France. CONCACAF fined the club $11,000 and suspended it from international competition for one year.

Arnett Gardens advance to 2003 CONCACAF Champions' Cup

Group B

 FICA withdrew.

W Connection advance to 2003 CONCACAF Champions' Cup

References 

2002
1